The Pilgrims' School is a leading boys' preparatory school and cathedral school in the cathedral city of Winchester, Hampshire, England.

The school is renowned for sending their students to the nearby Winchester College, Eton College and other top senior schools.

The official date of establishment for the cathedral school is unknown but historical records indicate that choristers of Winchester Cathedral's renowned choir have been educated in the Close as early as the 7th century. The current school was opened in 1931. As it also educates choristers of the Winchester College Chapel Choir, the school maintains close links with the college.

History

A number of schools set up to educate the choir boys of Winchester Cathedral are known to have existed since Saxon times. Some scholars link them with Alta Schola, established in Winchester around AD 676.

The school moved to its present site and became a full preparatory school in 1931. It was officially registered as opened on 1 January 1935. The main building, redesigned by Sir Christopher Wren in the 17th century, is on the site of a former Roman villa, and includes a medieval hall and barn.

A pre-preparatory department was opened in 2007 to meet the growing demand for an early years programme.

Architecture 
The school hall contains England's oldest surviving wood double hammer-beamed roof, which used to accommodate the pilgrims travelling to the cathedral.

Houses
Upon entry, each boy is allocated to one of the 5 houses, known as 'Sets'. They compete in inter-set competitions and points are given for good conduct and academic performance, etc.
Romans
Saxons
Normans
Monks
Wrens

Boarding houses
Most boys are day pupils but the boarding programme is open to all. Cathedral Choristers or Quiristers generally board full-time while others return home for the weekend.

Main School
There are eightdormitories, and the building mainly houses the Winchester Cathedral Choristers and the majority of 'Commoners' (other pupils).

Q School
Q School, short for 'Quiristers School', is the property of Winchester College, because the Quiristers sing in the College Choir and used to be taught separately in this building when they were a full part of the Winchester College community.  However, in the 1960s it became uneconomical for the college to organise a separate school and curriculum from the rest of the boys, who were from Years 9-13, and so from 1966 onwards The Pilgrims' School welcomed Quiristers to be educated with the 'Commoners'. They still, however, have 4 dormitories for the Quiristers and some Commoners. The Quiristers continue to sing and rehearse at Winchester College, but are educated at The Pilgrims' School; staff at Q School are now solely members of staff at The Pilgrims' School.

Q School is situated on Kingsgate Street in Winchester, close to the main school site.

Headmasters

Alumni
Jules Knight, actor
Hugh Mitchell, actor
Stephen Barton, composer
Johnny Flynn, musician
Jamie Byng, publisher
Jack Dee, comedian
Patrick Gale, author
Jon Snow, broadcaster
Anthony Smith, sculptor

See also
List of the oldest schools in the world
For information about The Pilgrims' Hall - the earliest double hammer-beamed roof in England, see Winchester

References

External links 

 
ISI Inspection Reports
Joining The Pilgrims' School
A history of the Pilgrims' School and of the Choristers of Winchester Cathedral

Schools in Winchester
Choir schools in England
Grade I listed buildings in Hampshire
Boys' schools in Hampshire
Preparatory schools in Hampshire
Boarding schools in Hampshire
Private schools in Hampshire
Educational institutions established in 1931
1931 establishments in England